Pietro Larizza (21 July 1935 – 1 March 2021) was an Italian trade unionist, politician and syndicalist.

Larizza was born in Reggio Calabria. He was the general secretary of the Italian Labour Union (UIL), one of the biggest Italian trade unions, from February 1992 to 2000.

See also
Italian Labour Union

Notes

External links
 Larizza' personal file from italian Senate
 UIL official page

1935 births
2021 deaths
Italian trade unionists
Italian syndicalists
People from Reggio Calabria